Bin He is a Chinese American biomedical engineering scientist. He was the Trustee Professor and Head of the Department of Biomedical Engineering, and Professor by courtesy in the Department of Electrical and Computer Engineering, and Professor of the Neuroscience Institute at Carnegie Mellon University. Prior, he was Distinguished McKnight University Professor of Biomedical Engineering and Medtronic-Bakken Endowed Chair for Engineering in Medicine at the University of Minnesota. He previously served as the director of the Institute for Engineering in Medicine and the Center for Neuroengineering at the University of Minnesota. He is the Editor in Chief of the IEEE Transactions on Biomedical Engineering. He was the president of the IEEE Engineering in Medicine & Biology Society (EMBS) from 2009 to 2010.

Biography
Bin He received his BS in 1982 in electrical engineering, from Zhejiang University, Hangzhou, China. He later went to study in Japan and obtained his M.S. in electrical engineering and PhD (highest honors) in bioelectrical engineering from the Tokyo Institute of Technology.

Bin He completed his postdoctoral fellowship at Harvard-MIT Division of Health Sciences and Technology in the United States. After working as a Research Scientist at MIT, he later joined the faculty of Electrical Engineering and Bioengineering at the University of Illinois at Chicago, where Bin He was named a University Scholar by the university president.

In January 2004, Bin He became the Professor of Biomedical Engineering, Electrical Engineering, and Neuroscience at the University of Minnesota, Minneapolis. He also served as the founding director of Center for Neuroengineering at Minnesota. Since 2011, Bin He has served as the director of the NSF IGERT Training Program on Systems Neuroengineering. In August 2012, Bin He was named the director of the Institute for Engineering in Medicine, a campus-wide research institute aimed at advancing innovative engineering solutions for tomorrow's medicine, by fostering collaborations between biomedical colleges and College of Science and Engineering at the University of Minnesota. In February 2018, Bin He became the Department Head of the Department of Biomedical Engineering at Carnegie Mellon University. He leads the Biomedical Functional Imaging and Neuroengineering Laboratory, which was founded at the University of Minnesota and relocated to Carnegie Mellon University in 2018.  He resigned from his position of the Head of the Biomedical Engineering Department in 2021, and was soon replaced by Keith Cook .

Awards

Bin He has been recognized by a number of prestigious awards, including the IEEE EMBS Academic Career Achievements Award in 2015, IEEE Biomedical Engineering Award in 2017, IEEE EMBS Willian J Morlock Award in 2019, among others.

Research

Bin He has made significant research and education contributions to the field of neuroengineering and biomedical imaging, including functional biomedical imaging, multimodal neuroimaging, and noninvasive brain-computer interface (BCI). His pioneering research has helped transforming electroencephalography from a 1-dimensional detection technique to 3-dimensional neuroimaging modality.

References

External links
 Treating sickle cell pain deep in the brain
 Bin He Honored with IEEE EMBS William J. Morlock Award
 First-ever noninvasive mind-controlled robotic arm
 Biography of Bin He at Carnegie Mellon University
 The Department of Biomedical Engineering at Carnegie Mellon University
 Biomedical Functional Imaging and Neuroengineering Laboratory at Carnegie Mellon University
 Biography of Bin He at the University of Minnesota

1957 births
Chinese emigrants to the United States
Chinese bioengineers
21st-century American engineers
Living people
Zhejiang University alumni
Harvard University staff
University of Illinois Chicago faculty
University of Minnesota faculty
Tokyo Institute of Technology alumni
Fellow Members of the IEEE
Fellows of the American Institute for Medical and Biological Engineering
Educators from Hangzhou
Engineers from Zhejiang
Biologists from Zhejiang